Alberbury with Cardeston is a civil parish in Shropshire, England. According to the 2001 census it had a population of 645 (though in 2005 the parish expanded with the annexation of half of the former Wollaston parish), increasing to 1,011 at the 2011 Census. It includes the villages and hamlets of Alberbury, Cardeston, Little Shrawardine, Wollaston, Halfway House, Wattlesborough Heath and Rowton, and has Alberbury Castle and Wattlesborough Castle within its borders. To the west the parish borders Wales, whilst to the north it is bounded by the River Severn.

See also
Listed buildings in Alberbury with Cardeston

References

External links 
 Parish Council Website

Civil parishes in Shropshire
Shrewsbury and Atcham